Palanjur is a village in the Pattukkottai taluk of Thanjavur district, Tamil Nadu, India.

Demographics 
As per the 2001 census, Palanjur had a total population of 2018 with 954 males and 1064 females. The sex ratio was 1115. The literacy rate was 72.74.

Administration
Palanjur comes under the Pattukkottai assembly constituency which elects a member to the Tamil Nadu Legislative Assembly once every five years and it is a part of the Thanjavur (Lok Sabha constituency) which elects its Member of Parliament (MP) once in five years.

References 

 

Villages in Thanjavur district